Strelac is a small village in the Municipality of Šmarješke Toplice in southeastern Slovenia. It lies in the historical region of Lower Carniola just south of Šmarjeta. The municipality is now included in the Southeast Slovenia Statistical Region.

Mass grave
Strelac is the site of a mass grave from the period immediately after the Second World War. It contains the remains of six unidentified victims murdered after the war.

References

External links
Strelac at Geopedia

Populated places in the Municipality of Šmarješke Toplice